Floro Dery (Born : 18 June 1958) is a Filipino illustrator best known for his work as design supervisor of the 1980s The Transformers TV series and was the visual creator of The Transformers: The Movie. He modified the 1984 character models originally designed by Shōhei Kohara and created the 1985 models, all of which became the visual guidelines both for the comic book and the animated cartoon appearances of those characters. He was also charged with designing all the characters introduced in the movie: Galvatron, Cyclonus, Scourge, Unicron, Ultra Magnus, Hot Rod/Rodimus Prime, Junkions, Quintessons, Springer, Blurr, Wheelie, Kup, and Arcee. Finally, he designed sets including Unicron (interior and exterior), Autobot City, Cybertron's moons, Hall of Heroes, the Planet of Junk, Quintessa, etc.

Floro Dery is also known for illustrating the Sunday edition of the syndicated The Amazing Spider-Man comic strip from 1982 to 1992. Design supervisor for the 1986 animated series Wildfire, he was responsible for character design. Dery worked alongside fellow Filipino, Alex Niño, as a storyboard artist for Sunbow Productions on Visionaries: Knights of the Magical Light. He was the character designer for the 1987 animated film Ultraman: The Adventure Begins.  He went on to be the production designer for Pirates of Dark Water and a storyboard artist for Spider-Man: The Animated Series.

External links
 
Interview with Futureal Studio
Lambiek Comiclopedia Article
Comics Illustrations According to Floro Dery - personal blog

Living people
Filipino animators
Filipino comics artists
Filipino storyboard artists
Production designers
1958 births